Ostra Vetere is a town and comune in the region of Marche, Italy, near the modern Ostra, south-east of Senigallia.

The original name of the town was Montenovo. In 1882 the name was changed in Ostra Vetere, after the ruins of the ancient Roman city of Ostra, located near the modern town along the Misa river.

References

Cities and towns in the Marche